This is a list of Canadian islands as ordered by area. The total area of these islands is 1,545,444 km2.

Islands over 1,000 km2

See also

List of Canadian islands by population
List of islands of Canada
Lists of islands

References

External links
United Nations Environment Programme list of islands by area
Sea Islands, Natural Resources Canada, The Atlas of Canada
Canadian Islands at Joshua Calder's World Island Information
Arctic Archipelago, M.J. Dunbar and Peter Adams, The Canadian Encyclopedia, 03/09/06

Area
Canada